Luis Manresa Formosa S.J. (April 8, 1915 – December 25, 2010) was a Guatemalan prelate of the Roman Catholic Church.

Luis Manresa Formosa born in Guatemala City, Guatemala in the spring of 1915 and was ordained a priest on July 29, 1948, in the Catholic religious order of the Society of Jesus. 
Appointed bishop of the Diocese of Los Altos Quetzaltenango-Totonicapan on November 30, 1955, he was ordained bishop on January 6, 1956, remaining in his post until May 30, 1979, when he resigned.

External links
Catholic Hierarchy

1915 births
2010 deaths
Guatemalan Roman Catholic archbishops
20th-century Roman Catholic bishops in Guatemala
Participants in the Second Vatican Council
Guatemalan Jesuits
Jesuit archbishops
People from Guatemala City
Roman Catholic bishops of Los Altos Quetzaltenango-Totonicapán